Donald Bartlett (born April 1, 1960) is a Canadian curler who lives in Edmonton, Alberta. Bartlett  is best known for his many years playing lead for Kevin Martin.

In 1999 Bartlett's home town became host the Don Bartlett Curling Classic. Now an annual curling bonspiel, the tournament attracts many teams from across Canada as well as a number of international competitors.

Career
Don Bartlett played lead for Kevin Martin beginning in 1990. It was in 1991 that the team won the Brier that year. The team would win the 1997 Brier. Internationally, Bartlett has been to two World Curling Championships and two Winter Olympics. At the 1991 Worlds, Martin,third Kevin Park and second Dan Petryk won a silver medal. At the 1992 Winter Olympics (demonstration), the team finished in fourth place. In 1997, the team now consisting of Don Walchuk at third and Rudy Ramcharan at second placed fourth. At the 2002 Winter Olympics now with Carter Rycroft at second, the team won a silver medal. With Martin, Bartlett has been to seven Briers and has won two Canada Cups. Before Martin, Bartlett played with Pat Ryan. He went to the 1985 Brier as his alternate player.

Bartlett is currently the coach of Team Brendan Bottcher.

Personal life
Bartlett is retired and has two children.

References

External links
 
 Video: 

1960 births
Living people
Brier champions
Curlers at the 1992 Winter Olympics
Curlers at the 2002 Winter Olympics
Curlers from Newfoundland and Labrador
Medalists at the 2002 Winter Olympics
Olympic medalists in curling
Olympic silver medalists for Canada
People from Gander, Newfoundland and Labrador
Curlers from Edmonton
Canadian male curlers
Continental Cup of Curling participants
Canadian curling coaches
Canada Cup (curling) participants